Walter Düvert (2 October 1893 – 4 February 1972) was a general in the Wehrmacht of Nazi Germany during World War II. He was a recipient of the Knight's Cross of the Iron Cross. Düvert retired from active duty on 30 November 1944.

Awards and decorations

 Knight's Cross of the Iron Cross on 30 July 1941 as Generalmajor and commander of 13th Panzer Division

References

 

1893 births
1972 deaths
People from Görlitz
People from the Province of Silesia
Lieutenant generals of the German Army (Wehrmacht)
German Army  personnel of World War I
Recipients of the clasp to the Iron Cross, 1st class
Recipients of the Knight's Cross of the Iron Cross
Military personnel from Saxony